Otter Brook  is a community in the Canadian province of Nova Scotia, located in  Colchester County.

Navigator

References

Communities in Colchester County
General Service Areas in Nova Scotia